Alarije is a minor variety of white wine grape from Spain. It is most often used in blends.

History
Alarije is thought to originate in Spain. DNA analysis had shown that it was part of the Malvasia family, but more recent DNA analysis suggests that it is genetically distinct from Malvasia.

Distribution and Wines

Spain
Alarije is quite common in Extremadura, particularly in the Cañamero district. It is one of the varieties authorised for the Ribera del Guadiana Denominación de Origen Protegida (DOP).

Vine and Viticulture
To thrive in Extremadura, it must be tolerant of heat and drought.

Synonyms
Alarije is also known under the synonyms Aceria, Alarije Dorado, Alarije Verdoso, Arin, Aris, Barcelonés, Malvasía de Rioja, Malvasía Riojana, Rojal, Subirat, Subirat Parent, Villanueva, and Villanueva de La Serena.

References

Further reading
 Robinson, Jancis Vines, Grapes & Wines Mitchell Beazley 1986

External links
 Guide to the wine grape varieties in Spain

Spanish wine
Grape varieties of Spain
White wine grape varieties